The 2004 United States Senate election in Georgia took place on November 2, 2004, alongside other elections to the United States Senate in other states as well as elections to the United States House of Representatives and various state and local elections. Incumbent Democratic U.S. Senator Zell Miller decided to retire instead of seeking a first full term in office, leaving an open seat. 

Representative Johnny Isakson, a Republican, won the open seat, marking the first time in history that Republicans held both of Georgia’s Senate seats. Democratic nominee Denise Majette became both the first African American and the first woman to be nominated for Senate in Georgia. Isakson would remain in the Senate until his resignation on December 31, 2019.

Democratic primary 
Following reports that Miller would retire, Democratic leaders unsuccessfully tried to convince outgoing Governor Roy Barnes to run for Senate. Max Cleland, a former Senator who lost his seat in the 2002 election, was also considered a possible candidate before choosing not to run. 

Majette's announcement that she would seek to replace Miller caught Democrats by surprise, as she was not on anyone's call list when Democrats began seeking a candidate to replace Miller. Further skepticism among Democrats about the viability of her candidacy surfaced when she announced that "God" had told her to run for the Senate. 

Nominee:
 Denise Majette, U.S. Representative from Decatur
Declined to run:

 Roy Barnes, former Governor of Georgia
 Max Cleland, former Senator
 Zell Miller, incumbent Senator
 Michelle Nunn, nonprofit executive and daughter of former Senator Sam Nunn

Republican primary

Candidates
Nominee
 Johnny Isakson, U.S. Representative from Marietta
Defeated in primary
 Herman Cain, former CEO of Godfather's Pizza
 Mac Collins, U.S. Representative from Butts County
Declined to run
 Ralph Reed, chair of the Georgia Republican Party

Campaign
Positioning himself as a political outsider, businessman Herman Cain spent nearly $1 million of his own money on his Senate campaign. To discredit Cain, Isakson's campaign dropped campaign mail pieces noting that Cain had donated to Democrats in the past, such as Hillary Clinton and Ted Kennedy.

Results

General election

Candidates
Allen Buckley (Libertarian)
Johnny Isakson, U.S. Representative from Marietta (Republican)
Dennise Majette, U.S. Representative from Decatur (Democratic)

Campaign
Majette received important endorsements from U.S. Senators Mary Landrieu of Louisiana and Debbie Stabenow of Michigan, along with many others in Washington who campaigned and raised money for Majette. Her Senate campaign slogan was "I'll be nobody's Senator, but yours."

A number of factors led to Majette's loss. These include her late start, her valuable time and money spent in the runoff, larger conservative turnout from a proposed constitutional amendment banning same-sex marriages (which Majette opposed), the popularity of President George W. Bush in Georgia, and her lack of experience (being a one-term congresswoman).

Debates
Complete video of debate, October 31, 2004

Predictions

Polling

Results

See also 
 2004 United States Senate elections

Notes

References 

2004 Georgia (U.S. state) elections
Georgia
2004
Herman Cain